24/7 is the debut solo album from Kevon Edmonds, after he left the group After 7. Released on October 26, 1999, via RCA Records, the album peaked at number 77 on the Billboard 200. The album's title track was certified gold and was the only album single to reach the Billboard Hot 100, peaking at number 10. The second single, "No Love (I'm Not Used to)", was released to radio, and rose to number 25 on Billboard R&B chart.

Track listing
Credits adapted from liner notes.

Personnel
Credits adapted from liner notes.
 Kevon Edmonds – lead and background vocals
 Babyface – keyboards, drum programming, electric guitar
 Daryl Simmons – keyboards, drum programming
 Gregory Curtis Sr. – keyboards, drum programming, background vocals
 Armando Colon – keyboards, drum programming, guitar
 Tim Kelley – acoustic piano, drum programming, bass, keyboards, mixing
 Bob Robinson – keyboards, acoustic piano
 Nathan East – bass
 Greg Phillinganes – piano
 Tommy Sims – bass, electric guitar, background vocals
 Michael Thompson – guitar
 Ricky Lawson – drums
 Damon Thomas – keyboards, drum programming
 Ronnie Garrett – bass
 Tony Williams – additional drum programming
 Dorian Daniels – additional drum programming
 Marc Nelson – background vocals
 IveyGirl -background vocals
 Jason Edmonds – background vocals
 Shanice Wilson – background vocals
 N8 – background vocals
 Melvin Edmonds – background vocals
 Charlotte Gibson – background vocals
 Robert Newt – background vocals
 Anthem – background vocals
 Paul Boutin – recording engineer
 Brandon Harris – recording engineer
 Ryan Dorn – recording engineer
 Brian Smith – recording engineer, mixing
 Jon Gass – mixing
 Dave Pensado – mixing
 Brad Gilderman – mixing
 Manny Marroquin – mixing

Charts

Weekly charts

Year-end charts

References

1999 debut albums
Kevon Edmonds albums
Albums produced by Babyface (musician)
Albums produced by Tim & Bob
RCA Records albums